Limnonectes poilani is a species of frog in the family Dicroglossidae from eastern Cambodia and southern Vietnam. It was originally described as a subspecies of Limnonectes kohchangae with whom it has been confused.

Limnonectes poilani is an uncommon species found in upland forests. It is not considered threatened by the IUCN.

References

poilani
Amphibians of Cambodia
Amphibians of Vietnam
Amphibians described in 1942